Diabolik Lovers is a Japanese anime series based on the video game of the same name. An anime adaptation was first announced at a 2013 event called the "Rejet Fes 2013 Viva La Revolution". During the "Otomate Party 2013" event later that year, it was announced that the adaptation would be directed by Atsushi Matsumoto and produced by the Zexcs studio. It aired on AT-X along with online streaming on Niconico between September 16 and December 9, 2013. Crunchyroll also picked the adaptation up for streaming in territories including the United States and Canada. It was subsequently licensed by Sentai Filmworks and was released with an English dub and subtitles by the company on a 2-disc DVD volume set on December 2, 2014. The opening theme is "Mr.SADISTIC NIGHT" by Hikaru Midorikawa and Kōsuke Toriumi while the ending theme is "Nightmare" by Yuki Hayashi. The second opening is "Kindan no 666" by Ryōhei Kimura and Daisuke Kishio. The DVD contained several mini dramas depicting events that occurred to the Sakamaki's off-screen during the anime. An OVA episode was bundled together with the Diabolik Lovers: Dark Fate game and released on February 28, 2015. The Blu-ray edition of the series was released in 2015.

A second anime adaptation titled Diabolik Lovers More, Blood was directed by Risako Yoshida and written by Hiroko Kusanagi with a returning voice cast. The series comprised 12 episodes and aired from September 23 to December 3, 2015. The Blu-ray DVD edition of the second series was released on January 4, 2017, and the Diabolik Lovers II: More, Blood Complete Collection was released on DVD and Blu-ray on March 28, 2017. The second season was also licensed by Sentai Filmworks and received an English dub in March 2017.

Episode list

Diabolik Lovers (2013)

Diabolik Lovers More, Blood (2015)

References

Diabolik Lovers